Eric McKenzie (born 28 August 1958) is a New Zealand former professional racing cyclist. He won the 1979 Tour of Southland and rode in four editions of the Tour de France (1982, 1983, 1984 and 1985). In the 1982 Tour de France he finished fifth in two stages and in 1983 Tour de France achieved stage finishes of third and fourth.

Major results
Results:
1979
 1st Overall Tour of Southland
 4th Overall Dulux Six Day
1982
 3rd GP Union Dortmund
 3rd Tour du Nord-Ouest
 4th Omloop van West-Brabant
 7th Overall Setmana-Catalana
 10th Trofeo Laigueglia
1983
 4th Omloop van het Houtland Lichtervelde
 5th Gran Piemonte
 6th [Circuit des Frontières
 6th GP Frans Melckenbeek
 10th Kuurne–Brussels–Kuurne
1984
 7th Clasica de Sabinanigo
1985
 3rd Leeuwse Pijl
 4th Grote Prijs Jef Scherens
 7th Grote Prijs Marcel Kint
1986
 2nd  GP Benego
 3rd Overall Tour de Picardie
 3rd Meiprijs - Ereprijs Victor de Bruyne
 5th Binche–Chimay–Binche

References

External links
 

1958 births
Living people
New Zealand male cyclists
People from Kawerau
Cyclists at the 1978 Commonwealth Games
Commonwealth Games competitors for New Zealand
Sportspeople from the Bay of Plenty Region
20th-century New Zealand people